Peter Boyle (26 April 1876 – 24 June 1939) was an Irish footballer and manager. Born in Carlingford in Ireland, Boyle was a left back whose most successful playing spell was with Sheffield United with whom he reached the FA Cup Final on three occasions, playing on the winning side on two of them. He also played for Sunderland and Motherwell as well as representing Ireland on five occasions. He later had a brief spell as player-manager with York City in 1912.

Career

Club career
Boyle moved from his home in Scotland to join Sunderland in 1896, making his Football League debut against Blackburn Rovers in December of that year. After two years at the Wearside club he moved south to the League champions Sheffield United in December 1898 for £175. He became a regular for the Blades in a period when they were a dominant force in English football, finishing runners-up in the league in his first season and winning the FA Cup in both 1899 and 1902 along with another unsuccessful appearance in the 1901 FA Cup Final.

Described as a 'robust' player by the local media he was considered a 'fine tackler' and 'superb kicker' during his time at Bramall Lane. By 1903 however his relationship with the club had deteriorated following a dispute after the club failed to award him a benefit match which he believed he was owed. He was twice suspended for 'misconduct' before being transferred for a 'nominal' fee of £100 in 1904.

Having told United that he wished to return to Scotland, Boyle spent only one season at Motherwell before he moved to Clapton Orient who had recently been admitted to the Football League. He then drifted back into the amateur game with brief spells at Wigan Town, Chorley and Eccles Borough where his playing career looked to have come to an end.

After several years out of the game, however, Boyle was appointed as player-manager of newly admitted Midland League team York City in 1912, before being replaced by Tommy Collier later the same season.

International career
Boyle was capped five times for Ireland during his time with Sheffield United. He would have won several more had he not rejected the call-up on a number of occasions to play for the Blades instead.

Personal life
Although born in Ireland, Boyle's family had moved to Scotland when he was a child and it was here he began playing football regularly. Following the end of his playing career he worked as a miner at Brodsworth Colliery where he also coached the colliery football team, Brodsworth Main, now Brodsworth Welfare A.F.C. His son Tommy Boyle would also go on to play for Sheffield United with whom he also won an FA Cup winners medal in 1925.

Honours
Sheffield United
Football League First Division Runner-up: 1899–1900
FA Cup Winner: 1899, 1902
Finalist: 1901

References

1876 births
1939 deaths
Irish association footballers (before 1923)
Pre-1950 IFA international footballers
Association football defenders
English Football League players
Albion Rovers F.C. players
Sunderland A.F.C. players
Sheffield United F.C. players
Motherwell F.C. players
Leyton Orient F.C. players
Chorley F.C. players
York City F.C. (1908) players
Republic of Ireland football managers
York City F.C. (1908) managers
Eccles United F.C. players
People from Carlingford, County Louth
Footballers from Coatbridge
FA Cup Final players